Pischelsdorf am Kulm is since 2015 a municipality in Weiz District in Styria, Austria. In the Styria municipal structural reform, the new town was formed by merging Pischelsdorf in der Steiermark with the smaller villages of Reichendorf and Kulm bei Weiz, to reduce costs and ease election of town officials.

History 
The municipality was founded as part of the Styria municipal structural reform,
at the end of 2014, with closure of the communities Pischelsdorf in der Steiermark, Kulm bei Weiz and Reichendorf.
A petition, from the town of Reichendorf against the merger was brought to the  Verfassungsgerichtshof constitutional court, but was not successful.

Geography

Municipal organization 
The municipal territory includes the following 8 sections or seven Katastralgemeinden (population and area:  as of 1 January 2015):

 Hart (297)
 Kleinpesendorf (176)
 Kulming (127)
 Pischelsdorf in der Steiermark (1444)
 Reichendorf (621)
 Rohrbach am Kulm (357)
 Romatschachen (402)
 Schachen am Römerbach (206)
 Hart (364.75 ha)
 Kulming (187.69 ha)
 Pischelsdorf (453.95 ha)
 Reichendorf (493.86 ha)
 Rohrbach (399.95 ha)
 Romatschachen (534.32 ha)
 Schachen (378.81 ha)

Politics 
The first municipal vote of the new town, on 22 March 2015, had the following results:

 The mayor is Herbert Baier (ÖVP)
 The council has 21 seats and assigned as follows:
 11 ÖVP
 4 SPÖ
 4 FPÖ
 2 ALU-Alternative Liste Umweltschutz (Grüne)

Emergency Services 
Ensuring local security, the emergency service and the hazard or disaster response is handled in the market town Pischelsdorf by the Police Inspectorate Pischelsdorf. The Red Cross Ortsstelle Pischelsdorf and four volunteer fire departments ensured the fire brigades serve the following areas:
Fire Brigade Pischelsdorf with the KG Pischelsdorf, KG Schachen, KG Hart as part of the KG Oberrettenbach and KG Rothgmos of the Altgemeinde Oberrettenbach, the Feuerwehr Reichendorf with the KG Reichendorf, the Feuerwehr Rohrbach with the KG Kulming, KG Rohrbach am Kulm and the Fire Brigade Feuerwehr Romatschachen with the KG Romatschachen.

Culture and sights 
 Pfarrkirche Hll. Peter und Paul in Pischelsdorf.
 One of the biggest events in the region is the Pischeldorferstrasse Folk Festival (Volksfest) and Pischeldorferstrasse Management Exhibition. It is held annually on Ascension Day at the terrain around the grounds of Oststeirerhalle. It is organized as the traditional festival of the volunteer fire department Pischelsdorf; a special feature is the Agricultural Fair in tent hall and the large amusement park. The specialty of the festival, well known all over the town's borders, is grilled sausages cooked on a large charcoal grill in front of the festive guests.

References

External links 

Cities and towns in Weiz District